The European Film Award - Prix Eurimages has been awarded annually since 2007 by the European Film Academy. The winners are:

References

Eurimages
Awards established in 2007
2007 establishments in Europe